This is a list of beaches in Cape Verde.

Boa Vista

Praia de Atalanta
Praia de Cabral
Praia de Carquejinha
Praia de Chaves
Ervatão
Praia das Gatas
Praia de Santa Mónica
Praia da Varandinha

Maio

Praia Gonçalo

Sal

Praia de Santa Maria - south

Santiago

Praia Baixo
Praia da Gamboa, Praia

Santo Antão

Praia d'Aranhas

São Vicente

Baía das Gatas
Boca da Lapa
Praia dos Flamengos - south
Praia Grande - northeast

See also

 
Beaches
Beaches
Cape Verde